Route 128 is a short highway in Grundy County.  Its northern terminus is at Crowder State Park northwest of Trenton; its southern terminus is less than three miles (5 km) south at Route 146. Despite being an even number, which normally runs east-west in Missouri, Route 128 is a north-south highway.

Route description
Route 128 begins at an intersection with Route 146 west of Trenton, heading north as a two-lane undivided road. The route runs through forested areas of Crowder State Park, passing to the west of Crowder Lake. Route 128 curves west and reaches its northern terminus within the state park.

Major intersections

References

128
Transportation in Grundy County, Missouri